Emilio Gómez Estrada (born 28 November 1991) is an Ecuadorian professional tennis player competing primarily on the ATP Challenger Tour. He is currently the No. 1 Ecuadorian tennis player. On 20 February 2023, he reached his highest ATP singles ranking of world No. 90 and his highest doubles ranking of world No. 254 was achieved on 14 September 2015.

Career

2016-2018
He defeated Adam Hornby of Barbados during Davis Cup play on March 4, 2016, by a score of 6–0, 6–0, 6–0, making him the first player to win by such a scoreline at any tournament since 2011, and one of two players to accomplish the feat on that day (Jarkko Nieminen of Finland earned a triple bagel victory over Courtney John Lock of Zimbabwe at Davis Cup competition elsewhere).

2019-2021: First Challenger title, Top 200 & Grand Slam debuts
He reached the top 200 on 29 April 2019 following his first title at the 2019 Tallahassee Tennis Challenger in Florida.

Gómez made his Grand Slam main draw debut at the 2020 French Open as a qualifier where he was defeated by Lorenzo Sonego in the first round.

2022: Australian Open debut, Two Challenger titles & four more finals, Top 100
He made his 2022 Australian Open debut as a qualifier where he lost to 27th seed Marin Cilic.

He reached his sixth Challenger final of the year in Gwangju, South Korea. As a result he reached the top 100 in the rankings at a new career-high of world No. 98 on 10 October 2022.

2023: First ATP quarterfinal 
In Dallas he defeated Gabriel Diallo and fourth seed Miomir Kecmanovic to reach the quarterfinals. Before the tournament he had won only three ATP matches. As a result he moved to a new career high of No. 94 on 13 February 2023.

In his next tournament in Delray Beach, he continued his good form winning his opening match against qualifier Wu Tung-lin.

Personal Info
Emilio is the son of Grand Slam champion and former doubles world no. 1 Andrés Gómez. He is also cousin of former singles world no. 6 Nicolás Lapentti and Roberto Quiroz.

Performance Timeline

Current through the 2022 Australian Open

Challenger and Futures finals

Singles: 22 (14–8)

Doubles: 22 (12–10)

Record against other players

Gómez's match record against players who have been ranked in the top 50, with those who are active in boldface. 
ATP Tour, Challenger and Future tournaments' main draw and qualifying matches are considered.

Notes

References

External links
 
 
 

1991 births
Living people
Ecuadorian male tennis players
Sportspeople from Guayaquil
Tennis players at the 2015 Pan American Games
Pan American Games bronze medalists for Ecuador
Pan American Games medalists in tennis
South American Games gold medalists for Ecuador
South American Games medalists in tennis
Competitors at the 2018 South American Games
Medalists at the 2015 Pan American Games